Dora Baltea or Doire Baltée is a river in northwestern Italy.

Name
The river's Latin name was Duria maior, Duria Baltica or Duria Bautica. Strabo called it Δουριας (Dourias) in Greek. The name "Duria" is from the Celtic root *dubr- ("flow"), found in many European river names such as Douro / Duero; it derives from Proto-Indo-European *dʰew- ("flow"). The second part may derive from the Illyrian root *balta ("‘swamp, marsh, white clay").

In the local languages, the river is called , ; .

Geography 
It originates by Mont Blanc as the confluence of the Dora di Ferret, fed by the Pré de Bar Glacier in Val Ferret, and the Dora di Veny, fed by the Miage Glacier and Brenva Glacier in Val Veny.

As it crosses the Aosta Valley, the Dora Baltea flows through the city of Aosta (where the Buthier runs into it) and near all the main cities of the lower Aosta Valley: Châtillon, Saint-Vincent, Verrès and Pont-Saint-Martin. After it enters Piedmont, it passes through the city of Ivrea and a good part of Canavese, gets from its right hand the waters of the Chiusella and reaches the Po at Crescentino, a little downstream from Chivasso.

Water uses
It is a popular place for whitewater rafting and kayaking. Early in the summer, in May and June, the rivers are usually high with snow melt from the mountains. During July, August and September the water levels are usually lower and the temperature warmer.

See also
The Dora Riparia is another tributary of the Po.

References

Rivers of Aosta Valley
Rivers of the Province of Turin
Rivers of the Province of Vercelli
Rivers of Italy
Rivers of the Alps